Paris 1919 is the third solo studio album by Welsh musician John Cale. It was released on 25 February 1973 by Reprise Records. Musicians such as Lowell George and Wilton Felder performed on the release. It was produced by Chris Thomas, who had previously worked producing Procol Harum.

In contrast to the experimental nature of much of John Cale's work before and after Paris 1919, the album is noted for its orchestral-influenced style, reminiscent of contemporary pop rock music. Its title is a reference to the 1919 Paris Peace Conference, and song contents explore various aspects of early 20th century Western Europe culture and history.

The album has received critical praise from several publications over the years, including AllMusic and Rolling Stone. It was reissued on 19 June 2006 by Rhino Records.

Recording
Paris 1919 was recorded in 1972 and 1973 with producer Chris Thomas, and, although musician credits were never given on the album's packaging until the 2006 Rhino expanded CD edition, it features Little Feat members Lowell George on guitar and Richie Hayward on drums, in addition to Wilton Felder of the Crusaders on bass as well as orchestration provided by the UCLA Symphony Orchestra.

Content 

AllMusic considers it the most accessible and traditional of Cale's albums, and the best-known of his work as a solo artist.

Paris 1919 takes its influences from pop and rock artists such as Brian Wilson, the Bee Gees, and Procol Harum, particular the latter band's popular 1972 live album Live in Concert with the Edmonton Symphony Orchestra. Lyrically, Cale recalls possible childhood memories in "Child's Christmas in Wales", whose title is a reference to a prose poem by Dylan Thomas and a reference to Thomas' poem "The Ballad of the Long-Legged Bait" in its second verse. Cale makes cultural and literary references to writer Graham Greene, William Shakespeare's Macbeth, Enoch Powell, Chipping Sodbury, Andalucia, Dunkirk, and Segovia, while "Antarctica Starts Here" is inspired by the 1950 Billy Wilder film Sunset Boulevard starring Gloria Swanson.

The album's title makes reference to the 1919 Paris Peace Conference, an event that established a new partitioning of Europe as well as the assignment of unilateral war reparations. With the event having arguably contributed substantially to the rise of the Third Reich and the emergence of World War II, Cale described the record as "an example of the nicest ways of saying something ugly."

Release and critical reception

Paris 1919 was released to warm critical reception. Rolling Stone writer Stephen Holden deemed it a "masterpiece" and "one of the most ambitious albums ever released under the name of 'pop'". He found that the songwriting "requires a great deal of listening in order for its full implications to be perceived".

Subsequent positive reviews continued to be published many years later. AllMusic critic Jason Ankeny praised its "richly poetic" songs for functioning as "enigmatic period pieces strongly evocative of their time and place". He also wrote that "there's little here to suggest either Cale's noisy, abrasive past or the chaos about to resurface in his subsequent work", since Cale, according to Ankeny, "for better or worse... never achieved a similar beauty again." Tiny Mix Tapes remarked that "Cale slyly crafted a brilliant achievement in Paris 1919 by utilizing a mournful gentility to catch his original target audience unaware and hiding in plain sight." In 2010, Los Angeles Times critic Matt Diehl called Paris 1919 "the idiosyncratic pinnacle to Cale's thrilling yet perverse career, despite the fact it never topped the charts".

Paris 1919 received a full reissue on 19 June 2006 by Rhino Records UK. The revamped version features the original album remastered, in addition to the outtake "Burned Out Affair", alternate and rehearsal versions of every song on the album, a hidden, unlisted instrumental version of "Macbeth", and the sound effects of the chirping birds found in the title track. Pitchfork gave the reissue a 9.5 out of 10 rating.

Live performances 

Cale has performed Paris 1919 live in its entirety throughout the world, beginning in Cardiff on 21 November 2009, with his regular band and a 19-piece orchestra, with new orchestral arrangements by Cale and composer Randall Woolf. The show was staged again in 2010 in London, Norwich, Paris, Brescia, Los Angeles, and Melbourne, then in 2011 in Barcelona, Essen, and Malmö, as well as two shows in New York City in January 2013.

Legacy 

The Wire included Paris 1919 in its list of "100 Records That Set the World on Fire (While No One Was Listening)". In 2016, Uncut ranked Paris 1919 at number 99 in its list of the 200 greatest albums of all time. The album was also featured in the book "1001 Albums You Must Hear Before You Die".

Songs from Paris 1919 have been covered by such notable musicians as Yo La Tengo, Manic Street Preachers frontman James Dean Bradfield, Owen Pallett, the David Sulzer String Quartet, Love and Rockets' David J, Okkervil River, Jay Bennett and Edward Burch, and Sally Timms.

Track listing

Personnel
 John Cale – vocals, piano, keyboards, viola, acoustic guitar
 Lowell George – electric guitar, acoustic guitar
 Wilton Felder – bass guitar, saxophone
 Richie Hayward – drums
 Chris Thomas – tambourine
 The UCLA Symphony Orchestra – strings
 Joel Druckman, Esq. – orchestra manager

Technical
 Chris Thomas – original album production
 Mike Salisbury – original album design and photography
 Andy Zax – reissue production
 Dave Schultz – remastering (at DigiPrep, Los Angeles)
 Matthew Specktor – liner notes
 Greg Allen – reissue art direction and design
 Bob Rush – additional booklet photography
 Project supervision for Rhino UK: Stuart Batsford and Mick Houghton
 Project assistance: Brian Kehew, Bill Inglot, Rick Conrad, Patrick Milligan, Cheryl Pawelski, Mason Williams, and Robin Hurley

References

External links

John Cale albums
1973 albums
Albums produced by Chris Thomas (record producer)
Reprise Records albums
Baroque pop albums